Abhisek Banerjee (born 18 May 1984) is an Indian cricketer. He played four List A matches for Bengal in 2009.

See also
 List of Bengal cricketers

References

External links
 

1984 births
Living people
Indian cricketers
Bengal cricketers
People from Durgapur, West Bengal